Fred Keating is a Canadian-American actor based in Greater Vancouver, Canada.

History  
Fred Keating was born in Columbus, Ohio in 1949 and raised in Detroit, Michigan. In the 1970s, after touring a one-man show through England, Scotland and Ireland Keating relocated to Edmonton, Alberta, Canada where he was a Special Guest Lecturer in the Department of Drama at the University of Alberta and Camrose Lutheran College (now The Augustana Campus of the University of Alberta) (1976-1978) Keating became one of the founding actors in Catalyst Theatre, an organization producing shows (televised and in schools/conferences) dealing with social issues. From 1978-1984, Keating worked as Senior Consultant for Performing Arts Education for several Alberta Ministers of Culture expanding and transforming the provincial government’s residential summer drama school into the ARTSTREK program with several feeder programs in different regions of the province.

45 years of hosting provincial, national and international events for all levels of government, corporate and NGO non-profit associations and charities has earned him the sobriquet “Canada’s Massacre of Ceremonies”. His own video production company, Lindisfarne Productions Inc., has created and produced hundreds of high definition video programs for those same clients. An affiliated company, Lindisfarne Productions (AB) Inc., maintains an office in Edmonton, Alberta. As of 2020 his IMDb.com site lists participation in 30+ feature films and 110+ television series. He also co-produced and co-hosted 125 episodes of the audio podcast “Monetizing Your Creativity” with Marvin Polis and hosted a weekly province-wide radio show called “Centre Stage” interviewing local and international artists passing through Western Canada.  Keating hosted the Canadian Film Festival in 1991 and the Banff World Television Festival in 1992. In 1996, Keating co-hosted the Leo Awards with Cynthia Stevenson in Vancouver. When Keating hosted the Rosie Awards in 2019, the Edmonton Journal reported that he was hosting the award show for his 25th time.

Roles 
Fred Keating's major acting roles include Councillor Jack Pierce on Da Vinci’s Inquest and Da Vinci’s City Hall, as well as Repeat Golightly on Jake and the Kid. Keating has also made short appearances in films such as The Core, Disney's Santa Clause 2, Walking Tall, and Miracle.

Awards 
In 2003, Keating was awarded the David Billington Award at the Calgary International Film Festival. In 2019, Keating was the first recipient of the hononorary AMPIA (Alberta Motion Picture Industries Association) Ambassador Award.

Filmography 
Per All Movie Guide

References

External links  
Official website

20th-century Canadian male actors
21st-century Canadian male actors
Male actors from Columbus, Ohio
Canadian male voice actors
Canadian male film actors
Living people
American emigrants to Canada
1949 births